Chester Conlan Carter (born October 3, 1934) is an American film, stage and television actor. He is perhaps best known for playing the medic "Doc" in the American drama television series Combat!, for which he was nominated for a Primetime Emmy Award in the category Outstanding Supporting Actor in a Comedy Series.

Life and career 
Carter was born in Center Ridge, Arkansas, and grew up on a farm. He attended Matthews High School in Missouri, where he was a state champtionpole vaulter. After graduating from Matthews High School in 1952, he attended Southeast Missouri State University, on a two-year athletic scholarship.

After serving in the United States Air Force for two years, Carter went to the Bay City Actors Lab in San Francisco, California, for three years, specialising in musical theatre. He supported himself by working as a field auditor for an insurance company, He then appeared in various dramatic and musical productions in California. He took over the title role in an Off-Broadway production of the musical Pal Joey when the original lead actor had to leave the production because of illness. He moved on to work in film and television, first appearing in the western television series Johnny Ringo in 1960.

Carter later starred in the legal drama television series The Law and Mr. Jones, playin the law student C.E. Carruthers, After the series ended in 1962, Carter guest-starred in other television programs including Gunsmoke, The Twilight Zone, Rawhide, Death Valley Days, Outlaws, The Westerner and Follow the Sun. He also appeared in films such as Quick, Before It Melts, White Lightning and Dixie Dynamite. In 1963, Carter played the medic "Doc" in the television series Combat!. He retired in 1986. His brother John Carter was also an actor.

References

External links 

Rotten Tomatoes profile

1934 births
Living people
People from Conway County, Arkansas
Male actors from Arkansas
American male film actors
American male television actors
American male stage actors
American male pole vaulters
20th-century American male actors
Southeast Missouri State University alumni
Western (genre) television actors